Porozhneye is a rural locality (a selo) and the administrative center of Porozhnensky Selsoviet, Shipunovsky District, Altai Krai, Russia. The population was 805 as of 2013. There are 10 streets.

Geography 
Porozhneye is located 34 km WNW of Shipunovo (the district's administrative centre) by road. Artamonovo is the nearest rural locality.

References 

Rural localities in Shipunovsky District